The Kia Kee is a South Korean concept car designed by Peter Schreyer for Kia Motors.

Basic Info 

The Kia Kee coupe concept is a compact, rear-driven, affordable production sports car, which is based on Hyundai recycled platform technology, it was first revealed at the 2007 Frankfurt Motor Show, in 2007. The Kee was heavily damaged while on its way to the LA Auto Show after it broke free of its cargo restraints and smashed its front end. It was shipped back to Italy for repairs.

Styling 

The Kee was one of the first Kia vehicles along with the Kia Soul to have the tiger nose design. It is a 4.3 meter long car which is a 4-seater, 2-door coupe. It uses light-weight aluminium or plastic panels and components wherever possible in order to reduce weight and further improve performance.

Engine 
The Kee is powered by a ‘next generation’ 2-litre, V-6 gasoline engine producing , mated to a six-speed automatic transmission, sending power to the front wheels.

References 

Kee